ISO/IEC JTC 1/SC 23 Digitally recorded media for information interchange and storage is a standardization subcommittee of the joint technical committee ISO/IEC JTC 1 of the International Organization for Standardization (ISO) and the International Electrotechnical Commission (IEC), which develops and facilitates standards within the field of removable digital storage media for digital information interchange. The international secretariat of ISO/IEC JTC 1/SC 23 is the Japanese Industrial Standards Committee (JISC) located in Japan.

History
The first ISO/TC 97/SC 23 Meeting was held in Tokyo in 1985. The subcommittee had the title, “Optical disk cartridges.” After the creation of JTC1, ISO/IEC JTC 1/SC 23 held its first plenary in November to December 1988 in Maastricht, Netherlands. The subcommittee title was later changed a number of times up to its current title, “Digitally recorded media for information interchange and storage,” as of 2006. In 1989, ISO/IEC JTC 1/SC 23 adopted the File Formats standards maintenance from ISO/IEC JTC 1/SC 15 and was also merged with ISO/IEC JTC 1/SC 11, “Magnetic recording tape and disc,” in 2004. The joint working group, ISO/IEC JTC 1/SC 23/JWG 1, with ISO/TC 42 and ISO/TC 171/SC 1 was created in 2008.

Scope
The scope of ISO/IEC JTC 1/SC 23 is “Standardization in the field of removable digital storage media utilizing optical, holographic and magnetic recording technologies, and flash memory technologies for digital information interchange, including:”
 Algorithms for lossless compression of data
 Volume and file structure
 Methods for determining the life expectancy of digital storage media
 Methods for error monitoring of digital storage media

Structure
ISO/IEC JTC 1/SC 23 presently has no active working groups (WG) or joint working groups (JWG). As a response to changing standardization needs, working groups of ISO/IEC JTC 1/SC 23 can be disbanded if their area of work is no longer applicable, or established if new working areas arise. The focus of a working group is described in the group's terms of reference. The following two working groups of ISO/IEC JTC 1/SC 23 were disbanded by resolution approved at the 2014 plenary meeting:

ISO/IEC JTC 1/SC 23/JWG 1 (WG 7) was disbanded in 2014 as the revision work of ISO/IEC 16963 was nearly completed and no future work was planned. The maintenance of ISO/IEC 16963 and related issues is now directly handled by ISO/IEC JTC 1/SC 23. ISO/IEC JTC 1/SC 23/WG 6 has had no activity since 2009 and since no new proposals were expected in the near future, it was disbanded in 2014.

Collaborations
ISO/IEC JTC 1/SC 23 works in close collaboration with a number of other organizations or subcommittees, both internal and external to ISO or IEC, in order to avoid conflicting or duplicative work. Organizations internal to ISO or IEC that collaborate with or are in liaison to ISO/IEC JTC 1/SC 23 include:
 ISO/TC 42, Photography
 ISO/TC 171, Document management applications
 ISO/TC 171/SC 1, Quality
 ISO/TC 215, Health informatics
 IEC TC 100/TA 6, Storage media, storage data structures, storage systems and equipment

Some organizations external to ISO or IEC that collaborate with or are in liaison to ISO/IEC JTC 1/SC 23 include:
 Ecma International
 World Intellectual Property Organization (WIPO)

Member countries
Countries pay a fee to ISO to be members of subcommittees.

The 7 "P" (participating) members of ISO/IEC JTC 1/SC 23 are: China, Japan, Republic of Korea, Netherlands, Russian Federation, Switzerland, and United States.

The 20 "O" (observer) members of ISO/IEC JTC 1/SC 23 are: Argentina, Belgium, Bosnia and Herzegovina, Bulgaria, Cuba, Czech Republic, Finland, France, Ghana, Hungary, Iceland, India, Indonesia, Islamic Republic of Iran, Italy, Kazakhstan, Poland, Romania, Serbia, and Thailand.

Published standards
ISO/IEC JTC 1/SC 23 currently has 145 published standards within the field of digitally recorded media for information interchange and storage, including:

See also
 ISO/IEC JTC 1
 Japanese Industrial Standards Committee
 International Organization for Standardization
 International Electrotechnical Commission

References

External links 
 ISO/IEC JTC 1/SC 23 page at ISO

023
Storage media